The House of Peoples of Bosnia and Herzegovina is one of the two chambers of the Parliamentary Assembly of Bosnia and Herzegovina, with the other chamber being the House of Representatives of Bosnia and Herzegovina. It was established through the signing of the Dayton Agreement in 1995.

It has 15 members equally distributed among the three ethnic groups in Bosnia and Herzegovina: 5 Bosniaks, 5 Serbs, and 5 Croats. The members are appointed by the parliaments of the constituent peoples. Their duty is to make sure that no law is passed unless all three groups agree on it.

Chairmen of the House of Peoples

List of delegates

Bosniak delegates

Croat delegates

Serb delegates

See also
Politics of Bosnia and Herzegovina
House of Representatives of Bosnia and Herzegovina
Parliamentary Assembly of Bosnia and Herzegovina

References

Parliamentary Assembly of Bosnia and Herzegovina
Bosnia and Herzegovina
Bosnia and Herzogovina parliaments